The Archbold Biological Station (ABS) is a research institute with a surrounding  estate near Lake Placid, Florida, USA.  It includes an extensive area of Florida scrub, a scientifically interesting and highly threatened ecosystem.  It was established in 1941 by Richard Archbold when his sponsorship of zoological research in New Guinea was curtailed by the outbreak of the Second World War in the Pacific region.  The Station supports 19 federally listed threatened species, including the Sand Skink (Neoseps reynoldsi) and 13 endemic plant species.  It is a venue for field research and education, as well as ranching.

The station and grounds are open to visitors, who must register at the main office.  There are some displays about the property and its history, a video about the biodiversity and conservation of the Lake Wales Ridge, a 1/2 mile nature trail and picnic tables.  Nature and environmental education programs are offered for schools, adults and specialty groups.

On July 20, 2007, the station was added to the U.S. National Register of Historic Places.

Archbold acquired the initial land for the biological research station through his friend Donald Roebling from his father, John A. Roebling II. Subsequently, additional land was purchased.

Climate
The climate of Archbold Biological Station is classified as humid subtropical (Köppen Cfa), with hot, humid summers and warm, drier winters. Its inland location on the well-drained sandy soil of the Lake Wales Ridge allows for high diurnal temperature variation.

References

Bibliography

External links
 
 Archbold Biological Station

1941 establishments in Florida
Biological research institutes in the United States
Buildings and structures in Highlands County, Florida
National Natural Landmarks in Florida
Nature reserves in Florida
National Register of Historic Places in Highlands County, Florida
Research institutes in Florida
Biological stations
Protected areas of Highlands County, Florida
Nature centers in Florida
Education in Highlands County, Florida